Ilijas Pašić (10 May 1934 – 2 February 2015) was a Yugoslav football player and manager.

Playing career

Club
He started playing football at Romania, but at the age of 18 he made a move to FK Željezničar. He played more than 250 games for the club as a left winger (174 of them were official games) and he scored almost 200 goals (104 in official matches). That makes him one of the best goalscorers in history of the club.

He made a move to Dinamo Zagreb in 1959 for which he played 95 games, scoring 31 goals in period of three seasons. However, injury stopped his career to rise even more. He later played in Austria and Switzerland.

International
In 1954. he made a debut for Yugoslav national team. That made him first player from FK Željezničar to do so. In total, he collected 8 caps. He also scored one goal (it was on his debut). He was a part of 1958 FIFA World Cup Yugoslav squad. He was also a member of Under-21 national team and B national team (18 games, 12 goals). His final international was a December 1959 friendly match against West Germany.

Managerial career
He worked as a coach in Switzerland. He was a head coach in NK Rijeka and BSK Slavonski Brod, before he returned to Switzerland once more.

Career statistics

As a player

Managerial statistics

Honours
Željezničar Sarajevo
Yugoslav Second League (Zone II): 1956–57

Dinamo Zagreb
Yugoslav Cup: 1959–60, 1962–63

NK Rijeka
Yugoslav Second League: 1970-71

References

External links

Profile on Yugoslavia / Serbia national team web page

1934 births
2015 deaths
People from Herceg Novi
Association football midfielders
Yugoslav footballers
Yugoslavia international footballers
1958 FIFA World Cup players
FK Željezničar Sarajevo players
GNK Dinamo Zagreb players
Yugoslav First League players
Yugoslav Second League players
Yugoslav expatriate footballers
Expatriate footballers in Austria
Yugoslav expatriate sportspeople in Austria
Yugoslav football managers
HNK Rijeka managers
FC Gossau managers
FC Luzern managers
Yugoslav expatriate football managers
Expatriate football managers in Switzerland
Yugoslav expatriate sportspeople in Switzerland